The Cork-Waterford rivalry is a hurling rivalry between Irish county teams Cork and Waterford, who first played each other in 1888. Since the turn of the century it has come to be regarded as one of the biggest rivalries in Gaelic games. Cork's home ground is Páirc Uí Chaoimh and Waterford's home ground is Walsh Park, however, championship meetings between the two sides have generally been held at neutral venues.

While Cork are the standard bearers in Munster, Waterford have enjoyed success at sporadic intervals. At All-Ireland level Cork are second on the all-time roll of honour with thirty titles, while Waterford have claimed just two All-Ireland titles.

It was the subject of a Laochra Gael episode on 22 April 2010, which covered the games between 2000 and 2007.

History

Early years

The first clash of Cork and Waterford occurred on 22 July 1888 in the inaugural Munster championship. It was Cork's second ever championship game while Waterford were making their very first appearance in the championship. For the first fifty years of the championship Cork held the Indian sign over the near neighbours and regularly dished out thirty and forty point drubbings.

Waterford emerge

In 1938 Waterford and Cork faced each other in the Munster semi-final. The Rebels had been going through a downturn since winning their last All-Ireland in 1931, while Waterford had been steadily improving. On that occasion Waterford recorded their first ever championship victory over Cork with a 5-2 to 1-3 score line.

Cork resumed their dominance over the next four meetings, however, when the sides met in the Munster final in 1948, Waterford edged a thrilling game. A narrow 4-7 to 3-9 victory gave Waterford their second ever championship victory over the Rebels.

The first great rivalry of the 21st century

After an absence of eight years, Cork and Waterford faced off in the championship in a Munster semi-final on 13 June 1999. Waterford, as provincial runners-up the previous year, were installed as favourites against a young and inexperienced Cork team. Mickey O'Connell proved the star for Cork as they recorded a 0-24 to 1-15 victory.

Three years later in 2002 Cork and Waterford clashed in another Munster semi-final. A new-look Waterford, sporting blue shorts for the first time in twenty years, shaded a thrilling game by 1-16 to 1-15. It was their first defeat of the Rebels in 13 years.

In 2003 Cork faced Waterford in the Munster final after a winter of discontent on Leeside had seen the hurling panel go on strike for better treatment and conditions. A high-scoring game saw John Mullane top score with 3-1, however, it wasn't enough as Cork triumphed by 3-16 to 3-12.

Twelve months later and Cork and Waterford produced what has been described as one of hurling's greatest games of the modern era. Cork, as reigning champions, had played against a wind in the opening half and built up a 1-14 to 2-8 lead. In the circumstances they looked comfortable, particularly as John Mullane had been dismissed at the start of the second half. But a Paul Flynn free that flew straight to the net changed everything in the second half, and with Flynn adding another five points and Ken McGrath leading the 14-man resistance from centre-back, Waterford prevailed, McGrath's catch at the very end as they protected a one-point lead the game's signature moment.

In 2005 the championship produced two games between Cork and Waterford. A two-point victory for Cork in the Munster semi-final was followed by an All-Ireland quarter-final meeting in Croke Park. A Brian Corcoran drop goal was the highlight of the game as Cork triumphed by 1-18 to 1-13.

After avoiding each other in the provincial series in 2006, the sides subsequently met in the All-Ireland semi-final. On a day when it looked as if Waterford would finally break their semi-final hoodoo and reach their first All-Ireland decider in forty-three years, Cork produced a new forward in the form of Cathal Naughton. Waterford had gone four points ahead when Naughton was sprung from the bench and captured 1-1 inside two minutes. A late Ken McGrath free was batted away by Cork goalkeeper Donal Óg Cusack. An almighty scrap for possession ensued with Cork emerging with the ball at the stroke of full-time.

Cork and Waterford clashed on three separate occasions during the 2007 championship. Cork stalwarts Donal Óg Cusack, Diarmuid O'Sullivan and Seán Óg Ó hAilpín were suspended for the Munster semi-final tie which saw Waterford dethrone reigning provincial champions Cork. After a pulsating eight-goal encounter, the Déise emerged as 5-15 to 3-18 winners. Both sides faced each other again in the All-Ireland quarter-final at Croke Park in front of a record attendance of 72,426 for this fixture. Both sides provided another pulsating chapter to their rivalry with the game still alive deep in time added on. Substitute Eoin McGrath got inside the Cork defence at the Canal End with his side trailing by one point and time ticking away. His shot was saved by Cork goalkeeper Donal Óg Cusack, the rebound came out to Paul Flynn who pulled first time only to see it saved on the line by Diarmuid O'Sullivan. Cusack seemed to lie on the ball and was immediately challenged by Flynn. The resultant free saw Eoin Kelly tap to sliotar over the bar to level the game at 3-16 apiece and force a replay. The third game between the two was a tense affair, with Dan Shanahan netting a brace of goals to seal a 2-17 to 0-20 victory.

After nine meetings in six championships, the Cork-Waterford rivalry took a three-year hiatus and resumed with a Munster final clash in 2010. Once again the game was a close affair with veteran Tony Browne scoring a late goal to level the match at 2-15 apiece. The replay created a piece of history as it was the first Munster decider to be played on a Saturday night under floodlights. When the sides finished level at the end of 70 minutes, it became the first Munster final replay to go to extra time since 1987. Dan Shanahan, who was introduced as a substitute for the injured John Mullane, scored the deciding goal in a 1-16 to 1-13 victory.

In 2012 both sides clashed in the All-Ireland quarter-final. Waterford led by three points entering the final stages, however, Cork outscored the Déise by 0-7 to 0-1 in the last five minutes to secure a 1-19 to 0-19 victory.

In their first Munster quarter-final clash in 39 years, Cork faced a scare against Waterford in the opening game of the 2014 championship. Trailing by nine points at one stage, the Rebels fought back to secure a 1-21 apiece draw before winning the replay by 14 points.

In 2015, Waterford won their third hurling league title with a comprehensive ten-point victory over Cork in the first decider between the counties since 1998. They followed this up five weeks later by beating Cork in the semi-final of the Munster championship by five points, their first Championship victory over the Rebels for five years.

Statistics

All time results

Championship

Records

Scorelines

 Biggest win:
 For Cork: Cork 13-4 - 0-1 Waterford, Munster quarter-final, Fraher Field, 24 June 1923
 For Waterford: Waterford 5-2 - 1-3 Cork, Munster semi-final, Fraher Field, 10 July 1938
 Highest aggregate:
 Cork 5-31 - 3-6 Waterford, Munster final, Semple Stadium, 18 July 1982

Top scorers

References

Waterford
Waterford county hurling team rivalries